Sir Henry Meredyth Chichele Plowden (26 September 1840 – 8 January 1920) was a British barrister, judge, and first-class cricketer. Plowden was a right-handed batsman who bowled right-arm roundarm off break. He was educated at Harrow and Trinity College, Cambridge.

Cricket career
Plowden made his first-class debut for Cambridge University against Cambridge Town Club in 1860 and represented Cambridge University in ten first-class matches from 1860 to 1863, with his final first-class match for the University coming against Oxford University in 1863. In his ten matches for the University, Plowden scored 139 runs at an average of 11.58, making a single half century which yielded his highest first-class score of 69*. With the ball he took 44 wickets at a bowling average of 10.58, with best figures of 7-25, one of four five-wicket hauls for the University. He also played for the Marylebone Cricket Club in 1863 against Oxford University. In 1865 he made his debut for Hampshire, playing a single first-class match for the county against Surrey. He made scores of 34 and 3 and took two wickets in this game. Plowden's final first-class match came in 1866 for the Marylebone Cricket Club against Hampshire.

Overall Plowden played 15 first-class matches, scoring 248 runs at an average of 13.05, with a top score of 69*. With the ball he took 56 wickets at a bowling average of 12.83, with best figures of 7/25 which was one of five five-wicket hauls.

Law career
Plowden was the Government Advocate at Lahore from 1870 to 1877 and Judge of the Chief Court in the Punjab from 1877 to 1894. He died at Sunninghill, Berkshire on 8 January 1920.

Family
He was born in Sylhet, the son of George Augustus Chichele Plowden (1810–1871) and Charlotte Elise née Robertson (1821–1862). In 1887 he married Helen Beadon, daughter of Sir Cecil Beadon (1816–1880) and his second wife Agnes née Sterndale (1836–1906). They had two daughters Sheila Meredyth Chichele Plowden (1888–?) and Joan Meredith Chichele Plowden (1890–1975).

References

External links

1840 births
1920 deaths
People from Sylhet
Alumni of Trinity College, Cambridge
English cricketers
Cambridge University cricketers
Marylebone Cricket Club cricketers
Hampshire cricketers
Southgate cricketers
Gentlemen of England cricketers
British India judges
Cricket players and officials awarded knighthoods
People educated at Harrow School
Knights Bachelor
Chief Justices of the Lahore High Court